Benton is a borough in Columbia County, Pennsylvania, United States. It is part of Northeastern Pennsylvania. The population was 824 at the 2020 census. It is part of the Bloomsburg-Berwick micropolitan area.

Geography

Benton is located in northern Columbia County at  (41.196144, -76.383354). It is surrounded by Benton Township, a separate municipality. Fishing Creek, a south-flowing tributary of the Susquehanna River, runs through the eastern part of Benton.

History
The Benton area was first settled by two families in 1792. A schoolhouse was opened in 1799. Starting around 1860, tanning and lumber industries began to grow north of the borough. By 1868, Benton had about fifty houses. In the year of 1910 Benton was destroyed by a fire. Two teenagers had lit firecrackers in a hay barn causing over 60 buildings to go up in flames. The town did not yet have a water system so the fire was unable to be extinguished. The Benton dam was built in 1915 as a result. However, this was not the end of Benton's disasters. Another fire struck just one year later destroying more houses. Again in 1962 a fire ripped through the town destroying the distillery and its warehouse containing over 17,000 bottles of whiskey. In 2011 benton was also ripped apart by a nasty flood. While Benton has sure went through many disasters, it is still here and thriving today.

Transportation
State highways. Two highways concurrently serve as Benton's Main Street:
Pennsylvania Route 239 leads east  to US 11 at Shickshinny on the Susquehanna River and northwest  to PA 42 at North Mountain.
Pennsylvania Route 487 leads north  to Ricketts Glen State Park and south  to Bloomsburg, the Columbia County seat.

Interstate highway:
Benton is 14 miles north of Interstate 80.

Air: Although Williamsport Regional Airport (IATA: IPT) is the closest airport with scheduled airline service, travelers often seek out the lower fares at Trenton–Mercer Airport (IATA: TTN) or Philadelphia International Airport (IATA: PHL).

Rail: (Historical information)  From 1888 - 1972, Benton was served by the Bloomsburg and Sullivan Railroad (later the Reading Railroad, Bloomsburg Branch).

Demographics

As of the census of 2000, there were 955 people, 394 households, and 265 families residing in the borough. The population density was 1,503.6 people per square mile (576.1/km²). There were 436 housing units at an average density of 686.5 per square mile (263.0/km²). The racial makeup of the borough was 99.69% White, 0.10% African American, and 0.21% from two or more races. Hispanic or Latino of any race were 0.10% of the population.

There were 394 households, out of which 33.2% had children under the age of 18 living with them, 48.5% were married couples living together, 12.9% had a female householder with no husband present, and 32.7% were non-families. 28.4% of all households were made up of individuals, and 10.4% had someone living alone who was 65 years of age or older. The average household size was 2.42 and the average family size was 2.95.

In the borough the population was spread out, with 25.9% under the age of 18, 10.3% from 18 to 24, 26.3% from 25 to 44, 22.3% from 45 to 64, and 15.3% who were 65 years of age or older. The median age was 36 years. For every 100 females, there were 91.4 males. For every 100 females age 18 and over, there were 84.9 males.

The median income for a household in the borough was $27,986, and the median income for a family was $32,125. Males had a median income of $28,015 versus $20,625 for females. The per capita income for the borough was $12,831. About 15.2% of families and 19.2% of the population were below the poverty line, including 29.0% of those under age 18 and 8.8% of those age 65 or over.

Education
Benton is in the Benton Area School District. The Appleman Elementary school is also in Benton. The nearest college with over 2000 students is the Bloomsburg University of Pennsylvania.

References

External links

Populated places established in 1793
Bloomsburg–Berwick metropolitan area
Boroughs in Columbia County, Pennsylvania
1833 establishments in Pennsylvania